Óscar Javier Lara Aréchiga (26 November 19517 October 2017) was a Mexican politician from the Institutional Revolutionary Party and a financial consultant and investor . From 2009 to 2012 he served as Deputy of the LXI Legislature of the Mexican Congress representing Sinaloa.

Education 

His early education was in Eldorado and in Culiacan, where he attended Elementary School in Eldorado and High School in Culiacan, both at the Autonomous University of Sinaloa. Also he graduated in the same house of studies BA in Economics. Later he made several graduate programs: the first at the Institute of Technical Training Public Sector Economic where he conducted studies on the formulation and evaluation of Agro industrial Projects; after the IPADE where he studied the program for Business Management, he attended Harvard University where he completed the Business Administration program.

Career 

For 22 years (1974 to 1996) he participated in the Mexican financial sector, beginning as a sub-branch manager in Banoro (Northwest Bank), institution that served as Manager of Planning, Deputy District Director, Deputy Director General and Director General, concluding his career in this sector.

During his career, he has had the opportunity to be an active part of the transformation of the Mexican financial system, to move from a system of savings and loans to a system of financial groups with comprehensive services and expertise in the various needs of the public saving, investment and other productive sectors.

In 1992, serving as Director of Planning Strategy Stock Exchange, Brokerage, he participated in the promotion to integrate the investor group that acquired Northwest Banoro to the Federal Government.
From this acquisition, Banoro, became the leading bank in northwestern Mexico, highlighted by credit volumes granted to the agro-food sectors - both in the social sector, and private - and small and medium-sized processing industries of regional agricultural production and promoting, strengthening regional production chains.

Also, in the public sector Banoro, the banking institution was more active in financing productive infrastructure projects carried out by state and municipal governments in northwestern Mexico.

As a public servant, during the administrations that led Mr. Juan S. Millan Lizarraga -. 1999-2004 and Mr. Jesus Aguilar Padilla -. 2005–2010, he had the honorable opportunity to hold the position of Secretary of Administration and Finance.

During his tenure as Secretary, a number of restructuring and modernization of the state administration, whose main purpose was to improve the delivery of public services to citizens and strengthen the public finances of the state were established.

As a result of the social and productive investment Sinaloa had indicators of economic growth and creation of jobs permanently, improving the levels of social welfare especially in the most vulnerable sectors.
To get an increasing flow of federal funds to Sinaloa, they maintained a proactive and cooperative participation to the National System of Fiscal Coordination, this generated the support of the secretaries of finance of the country to chair for two consecutive years the Permanent Commission of Fiscal Officers and six-year presidency of the Supervisory Committee of Federal Units.

In 2009, with the support of the Institutional Revolutionary Party (PRI), Oscar Javier participated as a candidate for Federal Deputy District VII, getting a great public support, which allowed him to be a member of the LXI Legislature Federal. As Federal Deputy, he had the honor of chairing the Water Resources Commission and be a member of the committees on Budget and Public Accounts, Accounting and Harmonization.

In his tenure as Federal Deputy, he permanently participated in the analysis, discussion, adaptation and adoption of appropriate initiatives; to modify, repeal or creating new laws, highlighting its importance in the creation of the General Laws of Climate Change and Competitiveness, as well as amendments to the Education Act, the taxation of Pemex and the Pensions Act for workers employed by the state, among others.

As Chairman of the Committee on Water Resources and a member of the Budget Committee, Oscar Javier also actively participated in the negotiations of revenue laws and decrees, budget of expenditures, which allowed to make the water sector national and specifically in Sinaloa there will be increasing budgets allocated to invest in strengthening and modernizing the productive infrastructure of Sinaloa, in regard to storage capacity as well as distribution of water.

In 2012, at the beginning of the administration of President Enrique Peña Nieto was appointed Deputy Director General of CONAGUA. In this position he was responsible for the Sub-Directorate General of Hydro-Agricultural Infrastructure, responsible for the planning, operation, modernization and construction of infrastructure that serves irrigation to more than one million farmers, irrigating area more than 10 million hectares surface in which 50% of national agricultural production and 70% of agricultural exports is harvested.

Similarly, the Sub-Directorate is responsible to plan and execute the construction of flood protection infrastructure in populated areas. In carrying out its responsibility as deputy director, and in order to boost productivity, profitability and competitiveness of the food sector in the country he prompted and the signing of a coordination agreement CONAGUA-SAGARPA took shape, so considering water availability, sustainable use thereof and the agricultural market conditions, planting surfaces were planned in each district of irrigation and productive region of the country. In January 2013 he returned to the private sector currently serving as adviser and consultant to national and international companies in the agribusiness, financial, commercial and engineering infrastructure sectors. It also continues as an investor in various companies like Agrofinanciera del Noroeste, Grupo Viz and Promocion y Gestion Consultoria de Negocios.

References

1951 births
2017 deaths
Politicians from Sinaloa
People from Culiacán
Members of the Chamber of Deputies (Mexico) for Sinaloa
Institutional Revolutionary Party politicians
21st-century Mexican politicians
Deputies of the LXI Legislature of Mexico